Boguslawski or Bogusławski (feminine: Bogusławska; plural: Bogusławscy) is a Polish surname. It is related to a number of surnames in other languages, including Boguslavsky and Bohuslavsky. Notable people with this surname include:

People

Boguslawski, Boguslawska 
 Andrzej Bogusławski (born 1931), Polish linguist
 Heinrich Georg von Boguslawski (1827–1884), German hydrographer
 Łukasz Bogusławski (born 1993), Polish footballer
 Marceli Bogusławski, Polish cyclist
 Marcin Bogusławski (born 1980), Polish artist
 Moissaye Boguslawski (1887–1944), American pianist and composer
 Palm Heinrich Ludwig von Boguslawski (1789–1851), German astronomy professor
 Teresa Bogusławska (1929–1945), Polish poet
 Wojciech Bogusławski (1757–1829), Polish actor, director, and playwright
 Andrzej Ścibor-Bogusławski (died 1729), Polish nobleman
 Krystyna Ścibor-Bogusławska (died 1783), Polish politician

Boguslavsky, Bohuslavsky 
 Irek Boguslavsky (born 1967), Russian politician
 Kseniya Boguslavskaya (1892–1972), Russian avant-garde artist
 Mykola Bohuslavsky (1850–1933), Ukrainian musician

See also 
 
 

Polish-language surnames